Dame Frances Silvia Patterson,  (29 November 1954 – 20 December 2016), styled The Hon. Mrs Justice Patterson, was a judge of the High Court of England and Wales.

Born in County Durham, Patterson was educated at The Queen's School, Chester and the University of Leicester.

Patterson was called to the bar at Middle Temple in 1977. Following a period as a Law Commissioner she was appointed to be a judge of the High Court of Justice (Queen's Bench Division) on 1 October 2013. 

Patterson was appointed a Dame Commander of the Order of the British Empire on 18 February 2014. 

She died after a short illness on 20 December 2016, aged 62. Patterson was survived by her husband, Dr Graham Nicholson, and their three sons, Oliver, Leo and Simon.

References

1954 births
2016 deaths
People educated at The Queen's School, Chester
Alumni of the University of Leicester
Members of the Middle Temple
Queen's Bench Division judges
English women judges
Dames Commander of the Order of the British Empire